Debu Majumdar (born 2 November 1976) is an Indian former cricketer. He played one first-class match for Bengal in 1999/00.

See also
 List of Bengal cricketers

References

External links
 

1976 births
Living people
Indian cricketers
Bengal cricketers
Cricketers from Kolkata